Arturo Bonifacio de la Garza Tijerina (born 12 July 1958) is a Mexican politician from the Institutional Revolutionary Party.
From 1997 to 2000 served as Deputy of the LXVIII H. Congreso del Estado de Nuevo León From 2000 to 2003 he served as Deputy of the LVIII Legislature of the Mexican Congress representing Nuevo León.

References

1958 births
Living people
Politicians from Monterrey
Institutional Revolutionary Party politicians
21st-century Mexican politicians
Deputies of the LVIII Legislature of Mexico
Members of the Chamber of Deputies (Mexico) for Nuevo León